Bignell is an unincorporated community in Lincoln County, Nebraska, United States.

History
A post office was established at Bignell in 1908, and remained in operation until it was discontinued in 1933. The community was named for E. C. Bignell, a railroad official.

References

Unincorporated communities in Lincoln County, Nebraska
Unincorporated communities in Nebraska